ISO 3166-2:MO is the entry for Macao (also called Macau in English) in ISO 3166-2, part of the ISO 3166 standard published by the International Organization for Standardization (ISO), which defines codes for the names of the principal subdivisions (e.g., provinces or states) of all countries coded in ISO 3166-1.

Currently no ISO 3166-2 codes are defined in the entry for Macao.

Macao, a special administrative region of China, is officially assigned the ISO 3166-1 alpha-2 code . Moreover, it is also assigned the ISO 3166-2 code  under the entry for China.

Changes
The following changes to the entry have been announced in newsletters by the ISO 3166/MA since the first publication of ISO 3166-2 in 1998:

See also
 Subdivisions of Macau
 FIPS region codes of Macau

External links
 ISO Online Browsing Platform: MO
 Districts of Macau, Statoids.com

2:MO
Geography of Macau